At the Battle of Edington, an army of the kingdom of Wessex under Alfred the Great defeated the Great Heathen Army led by the Dane Guthrum on a date between 6 and 12 May 878, resulting in the Treaty of Wedmore later the same year. Primary sources locate the battle at "Eðandun". Until a scholarly consensus linked the battle site with the present-day village of Edington in Wiltshire, it was known as the Battle of Ethandun. This name continues to be used.

Events before the battle
The first Viking raid on Anglo-Saxon England is thought to have occurred between 786 and 802 at Portland in the Kingdom of Wessex, when three Norse ships arrived; their men killed King Beorhtric's reeve. At the other end of the country, in the Kingdom of Northumbria, during 793 the holy island of Lindisfarne was raided. After the sacking of Lindisfarne, Viking raids around the coasts were somewhat sporadic until the 830s, when the attacks became more sustained. In 835, "heathen men" ravaged Sheppey. In 836, Ecgberht of Wessex met in battle a force of 35 ships at Carhampton, and in 838 he faced a combined force of Vikings and Cornishmen at Hingston Down in Cornwall.

The raiding continued and with each year became more intense. In 865–866 it escalated further with the arrival of what the Saxons called the Great Heathen Army. The annals do not report the size of the army, but modern estimates suggest between five hundred and a thousand men. It was said to have been under the leadership of the brothers Ivar the Boneless, Ubba, and Halfdan Ragnarsson. What made this army different from those before it was the intent of the leaders. These forces began "a new stage, that of conquest and residence". By 870, the Northmen had conquered the kingdoms of Northumbria and East Anglia, and in 871 they attacked Wessex. Of the nine battles mentioned by the Anglo-Saxon Chronicle during that year, only one was a West Saxon victory. In this year, Alfred succeeded his brother Ethelred, who died after the Battle of Merton.

Mercia had collapsed by 874, and the Army's cohesion went with it. Halfdan went back to Northumbria and fought the Picts and the Strathclyde Welsh to secure his northern kingdom. His army settled there, and he is not mentioned after 876, when "[the Danes] were engaged in ploughing and making a living for themselves". Guthrum, with two other unnamed kings, "departed for Cambridge in East Anglia". He made several attacks on Wessex, starting in 875, and in the last nearly captured Alfred in his winter fortress at Chippenham.

By 878, the Danes held the east and northeast of England; their defeat at the Battle of Ashdown had paused but not halted their advance. Alfred the Great had spent the winter preceding the Battle of Edington in the Somerset marsh of Athelney, protected somewhat by the natural defences of the country. In the spring of 878, he summoned his West Saxon forces and marched to Edington, where he met the Danes, led by Guthrum, in battle.

Alfred's position before the battle
Guthrum and his men had adopted the usual Danish strategy of occupying a fortified town and waiting for a peace "treaty", involving money in return for a promise to leave the kingdom immediately; Alfred shadowed the army, trying to prevent more damage than had already occurred. This started in 875 when Guthrum's army "eluded the West Saxon levies and got into Wareham". They then gave hostages and oaths to leave the country to Alfred, who paid them off. The Danes promptly slipped off to Exeter, even deeper into Alfred's kingdom, where they concluded in the autumn of 877 a "firm peace" with Alfred, under terms that entailed their leaving his kingdom and not returning. This they did, spending the rest of 877 (by the Gregorian calendar) in Gloucester (in the kingdom of Mercia). Alfred spent Christmas at Chippenham (in Wessex),  from Gloucester . The Danes attacked Chippenham "in midwinter after Twelfth Night", probably during the night of 6–7 January 878. They captured Chippenham and forced Alfred to retreat "with a small force" into the wilderness. (It is to this period that the story of Alfred burning the cakes belongs.)

Alfred seems at this time to have ineffectually chased the Danes around Wessex, while the Danes were in a position to do as they pleased. The Anglo-Saxon Chronicle attempts to convey the impression that Alfred held the initiative; it is "a bland chronicle which laconically charts the movements of the Danish victors while at the same time disingenuously striving to convey the impression that Alfred was in control", although it fails. Even if Alfred had caught up with the Danish force, it is unlikely that he could have accomplished anything. The fact that his army could not defend the fortified Chippenham, even in "an age... as yet untrained in siege warfare" casts great doubt on its ability to defeat the Danes in an open field, unaided by fortifications. There was little that Alfred could do about the Danish menace between 875 and the end of 877, beyond repeatedly paying the invaders off.

Battle

This was even truer after the Twelfth Night attack. With his small warband, a fraction of his army at Chippenham, Alfred could not hope to retake the town from the Danes, who had in previous battles (for example at Reading in 871) proved themselves adept at defending fortified positions. So he retreated to the south, preparing himself and his forces for another battle, and then defeated Guthrum and his host. The first we read of Alfred after the disaster at Chippenham is around Easter, when he built a fortress at Athelney. In the seventh week after Easter, or between 4 and 7 May, Alfred called a levy at Ecgbryhtesstan (Egbert's Stone). Many of the men in the counties around (Somerset, Wiltshire, and Hampshire) who had not already fled rallied to him there. The next day, Alfred's host moved to Iley Oak, and then the day after that to Eðandun. There, on an unknown date between 6 and 12 May, they fought the Danes. According to the Life:

After the victory, when the Danes had taken refuge in the fortress, the West Saxons removed all food that the Danes might be able to capture in a sortie, and waited. After two weeks, the hungry Danes sued for peace, giving Alfred "preliminary hostages and solemn oaths that they would leave his kingdom immediately", just as usual, but in addition promising that Guthrum would be baptized. The primary difference between this agreement and the treaties at Wareham and Exeter was that Alfred had decisively defeated the Danes at Edington, rather than just stopping them, and therefore it seemed more likely that they would keep to the terms of the treaty.

The primary reason for Alfred's victory was probably the relative size of the two armies. The men of even one shire could be a formidable fighting force, as those of Devon proved in the same year, defeating an army under Ubbe Ragnarsson at the Battle of Cynwit. In addition, in 875 Guthrum had lost the support of other Danish lords, including Ivar and Ubba. Further Danish forces had settled on the land before Guthrum attacked Wessex: in East Anglia, and in Mercia between the treaty at Exeter and the attack on Chippenham; many others were lost in a storm off Swanage in 876–877, with 120 ships wrecked. Internal disunity was threatening to tear the Danes apart, and they needed time to reorganize. Fortunately for Wessex, they did not use the time available effectively.

Location of the battle

The primary sources for the location of the battle are Asser's Life of King Alfred, which names the place as "Ethandun" and the Anglo-Saxon Chronicle, which has Eðandun. The chronicle was compiled during the reign of Alfred the Great and is thus a contemporary record. It is believed that Asser's Life was originally written in 893; however, no contemporary manuscript survives. A version of the Life, written in about 1000 and known as the Cotton Otho A. xii text, lasted until 1731, when it was destroyed in the fire at Ashburnham House. Before its destruction, this version had been transcribed and annotated; it is this transcription on which modern translations are based. Some scholars have suggested that Asser's life of King Alfred was a forgery.

The location of the battle accepted by most present-day historians is at Edington, near Westbury in Wiltshire.  However, the location has been much debated over the centuries. In 1904 William Henry Stevenson analysed possible sites and said "So far, there is nothing to prove the identity of this Eðandun [as named in the Anglo-Saxon Chronicle] with Edington" but then goes on to say that "there can be little reason for questioning it".

The reasoning to support the Eðandun of the Anglo-Saxon Chronicle and the Ethandun of Asser's Life being Edington in Wiltshire is derived from a trail of information from ancient manuscripts. Edington, Wiltshire, is known to have been part of Alfred's family estate. He left a manor called Eðandun to his wife in his will. A charter records a meeting of the king's council at Eðandun, although a later scribe has annotated the same document with Eðandune. In 968, another charter reported that King Edgar had granted land at Edyndon to Romsey Abbey. The Domesday Book of 1086 has an entry for Romsey Abbey holding land at Edendone in the county of Wiltshire at the time of Edward the Confessor (before 1066) and also in 1086, and this is known to be at Edington, Wiltshire.

Alternatives to Edington, Wiltshire, have been suggested since early times. The Tudor historian Polydore Vergil appears to have misread the ancient texts for the battle site, as he places it at Abyndoniam (Abingdon) instead of Edington. In the 19th century there was a resurgence in interest of medieval history and King Alfred was seen as a major hero. Although most early historians had sited the battle as in the Edington area, the significant interest in the subject encouraged many antiquarians to dig up Alfredian sites and also to propose alternatives for the location of the battle. Arguments for the alternative sites were generally name-based, although with the large interest in everything Alfredian in the 19th century, any site that had an Alfredian connection could be guaranteed large numbers of tourists, so this was also a driving force to find a link.

Consequences

Three weeks after the battle, Guthrum was baptised at Aller in Somerset with Alfred as his sponsor. It is possible that the enforced conversion was an attempt by Alfred to lock Guthrum into a Christian code of ethics, hoping it would ensure the Danes' compliance with any treaties agreed to. The converted Guthrum took the baptismal name of Athelstan.

Under the terms of the Treaty of Wedmore, the converted Guthrum was required to leave Wessex and return to East Anglia. Consequently, in 879 the Viking army left Chippenham  and made its way to Cirencester (in the kingdom of Mercia) and remained there for a year. The following year the army went to East Anglia, where it settled.

Also in 879, according to Asser, another Viking army sailed up the River Thames and wintered at Fulham in Middlesex. Over the next few years this particular Danish faction had several encounters with Alfred's forces. However, Alfred managed to contain this threat by reforming his military and setting up a system of fortified cities, known as burhs.

In 885 Asser reports that the Viking army that had settled in East Anglia had broken in a most insolent manner the peace they had established with Alfred, although Guthrum is not mentioned. Guthrum reigned as king in East Anglia until his death in 890, and although this period was not always peaceful he was not considered a threat.

In 886, the Treaty of Alfred and Guthrum defined the boundaries of their two kingdoms. The kingdom of Mercia was divided up, with part going to Alfred's Wessex and the other part to Guthrum's East Anglia. The agreement also defined the social classes of Danish East Anglia and their equivalents in Wessex. It tried to provide a framework that would minimise conflict and regulate commerce between the two peoples. It is not clear how seriously Guthrum took his conversion to Christianity, but he was the first of the Danish rulers of the English kingdoms to mint coins on the Alfredian model, under his baptismal name of Athelstan. By the end of the 9th century, all of the Anglo-Danish rulers were minting coins too. By the 10th century, the Anglo-Saxon model of kingship seems to have been universally adopted by the Anglo-Danish leadership.

After the defeat of Guthrum at the Battle of Edington, Alfred's reforms to military obligations in Wessex made it increasingly difficult for the Vikings to raid successfully. By 896 the Vikings gave up with some going to East Anglia and others going to Northumbria. It was under Alfred that the Viking threat was contained. However, the system of military reforms and the Burghal Hidage introduced by Edward the Elder enabled Alfred's successors to retake control of the lands occupied in the North of England by the Danes.

References

Sources

External links
 BBC Radio 4 Archive Programme – In Our Time: Alfred and the Battle of Edington

870s conflicts
Battles involving Wessex
Battles involving the Vikings
Military history of Wiltshire
Battles involving the Anglo-Saxons
878
9th century in England